Jeff Shipley (born August 9, 1988), is an American politician from the state of Iowa.

Shipley was born in Euclid, Ohio in 1988 and was raised in Naperville, Illinois, graduating high school from there. He received his B.A. in political science from the University of Iowa in 2010. Since 2011, he has been a resident of Fairfield, Iowa.

Electoral history

2014

2018

2020

2022

References

|-

Living people
1988 births
Republican Party members of the Iowa House of Representatives
21st-century American politicians